L'Alpagueur (aka The Hunter Will Get You) is a film written and directed by Philippe Labro and starring Jean-Paul Belmondo in the title role and Bruno Cremer as L'Epervier.

Released in 1976 and considered as a typical French thriller from the 1970s, it is one of many Belmondo's movie where he is playing the title role. Like in Le Magnifique, L'Incorrigible or Le Marginal, Belmondo is the real star of the show, playing a solitary character and pursuing bad guys. The score from Michel Colombier is typical from this period, mixing piano, modern rhythms and brass instruments.

Plot 
As one of the character is saying at the beginning of the movie:

L'alpagueur c'est un chasseur de tête, c'est un mercenaire, un marginal. L'alpagueur c'est l'astuce qu'a trouvé un haut fonctionnaire pour passer au-dessus de la routine policière.

The alpagueur is a head hunter, a mercenary, a marginal. The alpagueur is a trick made up by a state employee to be above the cop's routine.

Originally a deer hunter, l'Alpagueur became a head hunter working for the police, paid by them with money stolen from criminals. The main plot revolves around l'Alpagueur's pursuit of l'Épervier, (Sparrowhawk) a bank robber and an assassin, who kills whoever sees him commit a crime. His technique is to pay a young and naive man to be his accomplice and kill him right after. One of his accomplices, Costa Valdez, is only wounded during one of his hold ups, and with his help, l'Alpagueur manages to find l'Épervier at the end.

Cast
 Jean-Paul Belmondo – Roger Pilard aka "l'Alpagueur"
 Bruno Cremer – Gilbert aka "L'Epervier"
  – Granier
  – Costa Valdes
 Jean Négroni – Spitzer
  – Inspector Doumecq
 Jean-Pierre Jorris – Salicetti

Reception
The film was the 19th highest earning film of the year in France with 1,533,183 admissions.

References

External links
 
L'Alpagueur at Le Film Guide

1970s action thriller films
1970s crime action films
1970s crime thriller films
French crime action films
French action thriller films
French crime thriller films
1976 films
1970s French-language films
1970s French films